Orpington railway station is on the South Eastern Main Line, serving the town of Orpington in the London Borough of Bromley, south-east London. It is in Travelcard Zone 6.

History 

The station was opened on 2 March 1868 by the South Eastern Railway (SER), when the SER opened its cut-off line between Chislehurst and Sevenoaks. Previously, trains between London and Tunbridge Wells had taken a circuitous route via Redhill. The line was widened and the station rebuilt in 1904, expanding to six platforms. Third rail electrification reached Orpington in 1925, and extended to Sevenoaks in 1935.

Crofton Roman Villa was partly destroyed by a railway cutting in the late 1800s but was rediscovered in 1926 when work was carried out to the area to the west of the station entrance as an entrance to a new council building.

Platforms 7 and 8 were built in the early 1990s on the site of former carriage sidings. In 2008, the station became fully accessible following the opening of a new footbridge providing lift access to all platforms. As of 2013, the former steam locomotive shed (closed for steam in 1926; in use as sidings until 1960) is still standing, converted to offices (sited adjacent to platform 8). In 2014 the car park was rebuilt with 2 storeys to increase capacity.

Layout
The station has eight platforms. Platform 1 is a bay platform which is only occasionally used for Thameslink services.

Platforms 2-5 are through platforms. Platform 2 is used for fast services to Charing Cross or Cannon Street. Platforms 3 and 4 are an island, 3 used by trains towards Ashford International or Tunbridge Wells and 4 by stopping services from Sevenoaks to Charing Cross or Cannon Street. Platform 5 hosts the Sevenoaks slows.

Bay platforms 6-8 are for stopping services towards Charing Cross, London Victoria, Cannon Street and Luton/Bedford. At the country end, the four tracks become two. At the London end there is a four-road sidings, where trains are stabled and cleaned.

There are two entrances, both containing ticket offices and ticket barriers. The main entrance is on the platform 1/2 side (Crofton Road), while the other entrance is on the platform 5-8 side (Station Approach and the bus interchange). Access to platforms 3 and 4 is available via an underground subway (inaccessible for wheelchair users) or via a bridge opened in 2008 which incorporates lift access to all platforms.

Services 

The typical off-peak service in trains per hour is:
 2 tph to  via 
 2 tph to  via  (1 semi-fast, 1 stopping)

Connections
London Buses routes 51, 61, 208, 353, 358, B14, R1, R2, R3, R4, R5, R6, R7, R8, R9, R10, school routes 654, 684, night route N199 and Arriva Kent Thameside route 477 serve the station.

See also
Murder of Deborah Linsley – unsolved 1988 murder of a woman who boarded an Orpington-London Victoria train at Petts Wood. A man had been seen starring at women boarding the train at Orpington

References

External links 

Railway stations in the London Borough of Bromley
DfT Category C2 stations
Former South Eastern Railway (UK) stations
Railway stations in Great Britain opened in 1868
Railway stations served by Southeastern
Railway stations served by Govia Thameslink Railway
Railway station